Tu Mera Junoon is a 2019 Pakistani television soap opera, produced by Blue Eye Entertainment. It has Kinza Hashmi, Noor Hassan Rizvi, Sana Fakhar and Asad Siddiqui in leads. It airs every Monday to Friday on Geo Entertainment.

Cast
Kinza Hashmi as Hayat
Sana Fakhar as Roshan
Asad Siddiqui as Taimoor
Noor Hassan Rizvi as Salaar
Zainab Qayyum as Hayat's mother
Farah Nadir as Parveen
Beena Chaudhary as Roshan's mother
Rashid Farooqui

References 

2019 Pakistani television series debuts